Eurysthea lacordairei is a species of beetles in the family Cerambycidae. It was described by Jean Lacordaire in 1869.

References

External links 
Image of Eurysthea lacordairei at Biolib.cz

Elaphidiini
Beetles described in 1869